Ian Andrew Miller (born February 21, 1992) is an American professional baseball outfielder who is a free agent. He has played in Major League Baseball (MLB) for the Minnesota Twins and Chicago Cubs.

Career
Miller attended  Bishop Shanahan High School in Downingtown, Pennsylvania and played college baseball at Wagner College.

Seattle Mariners
Miller was drafted by the Seattle Mariners in the 14th round of the 2013 Major League Baseball draft. He signed and spent 2013 with both the Pulaski Mariners and Everett AquaSox, batting a combined .305 with one home run and 14 RBIs in 52 total games between both clubs. In 2014, he played for the Clinton LumberKings where he slashed .271/.332/.349 with 13 RBIs and 16 stolen bases in 45 games, and in 2015, he played for the Bakersfield Blaze and Jackson Generals, compiling a .267 batting average with 29 RBIs and 50 stolen bases in 126 total games. Miller returned to Jackson in 2016 and batted .253 with 28 RBIs and 49 stolen bases in 114 games. He spent 2017 with both the Arkansas Travelers and Tacoma Rainers and posted a combined .307 batting average with four home runs, 35 RBIs, and 43 stolen bases in 124 total games between the two teams.

In 2018, Miller returned to Tacoma, slashing .261/.333/.327 with two home runs, 41 RBIs, and 33 stolen bases in 114 games. He once again returned to Tacoma to open the 2019 season.

Minnesota Twins
On August 10, 2019, Miller was traded to the Minnesota Twins in exchange for cash considerations. He was assigned to the Rochester Red Wings following the trade.

On September 1, 2019, the Twins selected Miller's contract and promoted him to the major leagues. Miller made his major league debut on September 4 as a pinch runner and defensive replacement versus the Boston Red Sox. On October 28, Miller was outrighted off the Twins roster. He became a free agent following the 2019 season.

Chicago Cubs
On December 18, 2019, Miller signed a minor league contract with the Chicago Cubs. On August 23, 2020, Miller was selected to the active roster. On August 31, 2020, Miller was designated for assignment after only appearing in one game for the Cubs as a pinch runner. Miller elected free agency on October 14, 2020. On November 18, 2020, Miller re-signed with the Cubs on a minor league contract. He elected free agency on November 7, 2021.

References

External links

1992 births
Living people
American expatriate baseball players in Mexico
Baseball players from Philadelphia
Major League Baseball outfielders
Minnesota Twins players
Chicago Cubs players
Wagner Seahawks baseball players
Pulaski Mariners players
Everett AquaSox players
Clinton LumberKings players
Bakersfield Blaze players
Jackson Generals (Southern League) players
Arkansas Travelers players
Tacoma Rainiers players
Tomateros de Culiacán players
Peoria Javelinas players
Rochester Red Wings players
Iowa Cubs players
Yaquis de Obregón players
Mat-Su Miners players